Sirene was a Norwegian barque that was wrecked against Blackpool's North Pier on 9 October 1892.

History

Wreck
Sirene was sailing from Fleetwood, Lancashire, England, to Florida in the United States when she was caught in a storm on 9 October 1892 and ended up wrecked alongside North Pier, Blackpool, Lancashire. All eleven crew members jumped from the ship onto the pier and were saved.

External links
 Photo of the Sirene shipwreck.

References

1892 in the United Kingdom
1892 disasters in the United Kingdom
History of Blackpool
Maritime incidents in 1892
Shipwrecks in the Irish Sea
Shipwrecks of England
Sailing ships
1892 in England